Pavel Palazhchenko or Palazchenko (born 17 March 1949) is a former high-level Soviet conference interpreter who was the chief English interpreter for Mikhail Gorbachev and Soviet foreign minister Eduard Shevardnadze from 1985 and 1991.

Biography

Personal
Palazhchenko was born on 17 March 1949 in Monino, Moscow Oblast, Russia. He graduated from the Maurice Thorez Moscow Institute of Foreign Languages (Moscow State Linguistic University) in 1972.

Interpreter
As one of the leading interpreters of his time, Palazhchenko participated in all US-Soviet summit talks leading to the end of the Cold War.  He is the author of a personal and political memoir, My Years with Gorbachev and Shevardnadze: The Memoir of a Soviet Interpreter.

Writer
Palazhchenko also wrote the Moi Nesistematichesky Slovar or My Unsystematic Dictionary which was published in Russia by R. Valent publications in May 2002. The 300-page Russian-English dictionary provides information, insight and cultural observation on the linguistic twists and turns that lie between the English and Russian languages; and was a sequel to Palazhchenko’s other work: the English-Russian dictionary published in 1999.  The 1999 English-Russian dictionary dealt with trends in the political, diplomatic and journalistic usage in the English language.

In 2005, the third book of this series, Unsystematic Dictionary-2005 was published.

Associate
After becoming a long-time associate and aide to Mikhail Gorbachev for several years, Palazhchenko eventually became the head of the International Department of the International Non-governmental Foundation for Socio-Economic and Political Studies (or The Gorbachev Foundation), where he also functioned as an analyst, spokesperson, interpreter and translator.

See also
United Nations Interpretation Service
Igor Korchilov, UN Interpreter

References

Further reading
Not Lost in Translation by Boris Fishman, Diplomatic Immunity (An Anecdote), The New Yorker Magazine, NewYorker.com, date retrieved: 28 May 2007
Familiar Russian Interpreter Pavel Palazhchenko to Lecture on 7 October 1993, News Release, Stanford University News Service, 1 October 1993, date retrieved: 28 May 2007
My Years with Gorbachev and Shevardnadze: The Memoir of a Soviet Interpreter by Pavel Palazhchenko, 1997, Concentrating on the critical period of 1985–1991, Penn State University Press, 
Oscar Night (Mikhail Gorbachev via Pavel Palazhchenko) by Nick Paumgarten, The New Yorker, 1 April 2002, ErolMorris.com, date retrieved: 28 May 2007

External links

Pavel Palazhchenko's Website (in Russian)

United Nations interpreters
1949 births
Living people
Soviet officials of the United Nations
Moscow State Linguistic University alumni